Wrath of the Norsemen is a live DVD released by Swedish melodic death metal band Amon Amarth. It features live footage of the band playing their music. It also contains interviews and behind-the-scenes footage. The DVD was certified gold by the RIAA.

Track listing

Disc one
Also included backstage and other footage.

Disc two

Disc three

Credits

Band members 
 Fredrik Andersson – drums
 Olavi Mikkonen – guitars
 Johan Hegg – vocals
 Johan Söderberg  – guitars
 Ted Lundström – bass

Production 
 Amon Amarth – arranger, producer
 Anders Eriksson – post producer
 Thomas Ewerhard – design, cover art
 Harris Johns – mastering, mixing
 Achim Kohler – mastering, mixing

Release dates

References

Amon Amarth video albums
2006 video albums
Live video albums
2006 live albums
Metal Blade Records video albums